Tayyab Tahir (born 26 July 1993) is a Pakistani cricketer who plays for Southern Punjab.

Domestic career
In January 2021, Tayyab was named in Central Punjab's squad for the 2020–21 Pakistan Cup. Following the conclusion of the competition, he was named as the batsman of the tournament. 

In October 2021, in the second round of the 2021–22 Quaid-e-Azam Trophy, he scored his maiden century in first-class cricket.

In December 2022, ahead of the 2023 PSL, he was picked by the PSL franchise Karachi Kings. This would be his first participation in the Pakistan Super League. In the 14th match of the tournament, playing against Multan Sultans, he made his PSL debut and also got his maiden PSL half-century.

International career
In January 2023, Tayyab earned his maiden call for the national squad, named in the One Day International (ODI) squad for the New Zealand tour of Pakistan. He didn't play any of the three ODIs. Before his selection he played club cricket in England for some three years.

In March 2023, he was named in Pakistan's Twenty20 International (T20I) squad for the series against Afghanistan.

References

External links
 

1993 births
Living people
Punjabi people
Pakistani cricketers
Central Punjab cricketers
Lahore cricketers
Place of birth missing (living people)
Lahore Eagles cricketers